Tenen may refer to:

Ten'en, a Japanese era
Tatenen, also known as Tenen, an Egyptian god
Tenen Holtz (1877–1971), Russian Empire born American actor
Locum tenens, a Latin phrase meaning "place holder"